This article documents the history of Kelantan Football Association, a Malaysian association football team. For a general overview of the club, see Kelantan FA

Founded in 1946 as Kelantan Amateur Football Association but records show this football association already existed as early as 1889. Kelantan FA is the oldest football team in the east coast of Malaysia. The team is based in Kota Bharu, in the state of Kelantan, traditionally a conservative Muslim area. The team have consistently been a decent team throughout their history, producing top-class national team players such as Mustafa Hashim, Hamid Ramli and Kamaruddin Hamzah.

But the footballing landscape in Kelantan changed in 2007 when Annuar Musa took charge of the Kelantan Football Association leadership. His arrival brought several changes in terms of how the team was managed, immediately seeing returns as Kelantan went on to finish as runners up of the Malaysian Premier League in his first year. As a result, they gained promotion into the country's top tier, the Malaysian Super League, for the 2009 season. Kelantan finished sixth in the league, leaving a strong impression by emerging as runners-up in both the Malaysia FA Cup and Malaysia Cup.

But 2010 season proved to be their major breakthrough year. Kelantan performed consistently in the league, finishing second and ending their silverware drought by emphatically lifting the Malaysia Cup. It was a momentous period in which Kelantan finally announced their arrival as a major powerhouse.

Then came 2011, when Kelantan lived up to expectations by winning the league title for the first time in their history as well as reaching another Malaysia Cup final. But manager M. Karathu departed from his post, paving the way for Peter Butler to take charge.

Though Kelantan started the 2012 season with equally high expectations, the club got off to a controversial start after an apparent spat between Peter Butler and Annuar Musa. The Englishman was dismissed in favor of Croatian Bojan Hodak. Kelantan dominated Malaysian football by claiming a historic treble, while also reaching the quarter-finals of the AFC Cup in their maiden appearance. It was a fitting conclusion to a five-year span in which Kelantan evolved from a second division side into perhaps the best side in Malaysia.

At Asian level, Kelantan have made three appearances in AFC Cup competition. Their best performance was in 2012 where they lost to Iraqi Erbil in the quarterfinals.

Early years (1986–06), Presidential (2007–now)
In 1986, the Deputy Minister state of Kelantan, Datuk Haji Ahmad Rastom Haji Ahmad Maher led the association as the association president until 1990. In 1991, Kelantan's State Secretary, Datuk Haji Wan Hashim Wan Daud took over the leadership after the state government changed hands. In 2004, the presidency changed hands after Datuk Ahmad Yaakub Jazlan are given access to leading Kelantan football.

In 2005, Kelantan has become the only team that play in Malaysia FAM League, the third-tier football league after got relegated from Premier League.

Beginning in 2007, the landscape of football in Kelantan began to change when Annuar Musa was entrusted to lead the Kelantan Football as the president for term of 2007–10. Annuar called as the father of football development in Kelantan. During his first year as the president, Kelantan showed improvements obtaining third place in the 2007–08 Malaysia Premier League. During the 2008 Malaysia Cup campaign, although Kelantan failed to qualify for the quarterfinal, the team showed improvement in the group stage.

Annuar resigned from the position of president on 8 November 2016.

On 17 December 2017, Bibi Ramjani Ilias Khan has broken a Kelantan football tradition when she was selected as the first woman to head Kelantan Football Association since its establishment in 1946. She was the second woman in the country to be appointed as the president of a football association after Tunku Aminah Maimunah Iskandariah took the helm at Johor Darul Ta'zim in July 2016. KAFA deputy president Afandi Hamzah in announcing the appointment of Bibi Ramjani said the woman entrepreneur would be leading the association for the 2018 to 2021 term.

Peter Butler (2008–09, 2011–12)
After departure of French Régis Laguesse, Englishman Peter Butler has been appointed as Kelantan coach on 28 September 2008. Butler who are a former England and West Ham United midfielder in the 90s. He managed to make Kelantan home side went unbeaten in the 2008–09 season until venue irregularities had a home result lost by default by the Football Association of Malaysia. The game between Kelantan and KL PLUS was awarded 3–0 to KL PLUS as Kelantan could not agree on a suitable venue. However the result was then revoked and the game would be replayed at a later date.

Butler managed to help Kelantan gain promotion to the Malaysia Super League, the top league in Malaysian football. In 2009, he led the team in the final of the Malaysia FA Cup for the first time since it was introduced in 1990. However, they lost to Selangor on penalties 1–4. He also managed to lead the team in the Malaysia Cup final during same year. Butler resigned as coach a week before the 2009 Malaysia Cup campaign.

On 15 November 2012, Butler has been appointed as Kelantan coach for the second time after M. Karathu resigned from his position in late 2012. During his second stint, his best achievement was when led the team into 2012 Malaysia Charity Shield final. However, the team lost to Negeri Sembilan 2–1.

B. Sathianathan (2009–11)
Peter Butler has resigned from his post all of sudden on 29 February 2012, a week before kick-off the 2009 Malaysia Cup. The association has appointed the former national team handler, B. Sathianathan to fill the post. Sathianathan has led the team to the 2009 Malaysia Cup final where they lost 1–3 to Negeri Sembilan.

During the 2010 season, Sathianathan retained as team head coach. He brought in several former Malaysia national players, such as Akmal Rizal and Hairuddin Omar into the team. However, he failed to lead the team to the FA Cup final when they lost to Kedah on the away goals rule. He brought the first major trophy in Kelantan history in 2010 by winning the prestigious Malaysia Cup by beating Negeri Sembilan 2–1.

Somewhere in 2010, Sathianathan has been suspended for six months by Football Association of Malaysia for criticizing the league's fixture of 2009 season.

M. Karathu (2011)
After Sathianathan has been suspended for six months by Football Association of Malaysia and was banned from involve in any Malaysian football activities, M. Karathu has been appointed to fill the post for the second time after the last time in 1993. Karathu who also the former Perak coach 2009 has brought more success to the team when Kelantan won their first Sultan Haji Ahmad Shah Cup and also clinched their first Malaysia Super League title in 2011.

Kelantan have qualified to the 2011 Malaysia Cup final but lost to Terengganu. Karathu has announced his resignation as coach after his side unsuccess to win the 2011 Malaysia Cup. However, the reason given is that he wanted to spend time with his family.

Bojan Hodak (2012–13)

Bojan Hodak is MyTeam former head coach for three seasons since 2006 before he moved to Phom Penh Crown in the Cambodian League for six months. In 2011 to 2012, he was appointed as chief executive officer of the Academy of Al-Hamra Red Warriors.

However, after the withdrawal of Peter Butler from the post, he became head coach of Kelantan. During 2012 season, Kelantan has won their first FA Cup title beat Sime Darby 1–0 in the final. Bojan managed to retain the Super League title in 2012. His biggest achievement with the team when Kelantan won their first treble title during 2012 season. Hodak also managed to retain Malaysia FA Cup when Kelantan beat Johor Darul Takzim 1–0 in 2013 FA Cup final.

The 2013 Malaysia Cup final against Pahang was his last match with the team. Hodak announced its during a press conference at the Shah Alam Stadium. The Croatian has won it all with The Red Warriors, capturing the treble Malaysian Super League, FA Cup, and Malaysia Cup in his debut year as a coach last for 2012 season.

Steve Darby (2014)
During November 2012, Steve Darby a former Johor and Perak head coach was appointed as new Kelantan's head coach. He was replaced by George Boateng after a horrible 0–4 loss to Sime Darby.

George Boateng (2014–15)
Tan Sri Annuar Musa officially confirmed the appointment via his official Facebook page, and George Boateng will be assisted by six other coaches, including the current interim head coach Hashim Mustapha. The former Hull City skipper has a wealth of Premier League football experience and has also been capped by the Dutch national team on four occasions.

His last playing stint in Malaysia with T-Team will also be beneficial towards his understanding of the local game. He later was replaced by Azraai Khor in the middle 2015 Malaysia Super League season.

Azraai Khor (2015)
Azraai Khor came in the middle season to replace George Boateng. However his appointment could not help the team with only 1 win in the league during his management and his best achievement is becoming the 2015 Malaysia FA Cup runner up behind LionsXII. He resigned after 0–3 loss to LionsXII.

K. Devan (2016)
On 5 December 2015, K. Devan was officially introduced to the fan along with 3 of their new local player signing to play in upcoming 2016 season. After an unsatisfactory performance shown by the team in the league, he had make a decision to resign on 12 May 2016 citing personal reason.

Velizar Popov (2016)
On 12 May 2016, Kelantan FA has hired former Maldives national team coach, Velizar Popov to handle the Super League side until the end of the 2016 season following former head coach K. Devan's resignation after an unsatisfactory performance of the team under his guidance. Bulgarian Popov has been tasked to ensure Kelantan finish in the top four of the Super League and reach the semi-finals of the Malaysia Cup. He made his debut as Kelantan head coach playing against Selangor on away match on 18 May in Shah Alam Stadium with impressive performance played more than 70 min with 10 players after the red card of Wan Zack in the massive derby draw 0–0. Popov reached the most impressive and biggest win ever in the history of the club in away official match for Kelantan on 15 July against Terengganu with 6–1 in Kuala Terengganu in the East Coast Derby for the Malaysian Super League Week 14. Kelantan under Popov's guidance became the first team alongside Kedah to qualify for this year's Malaysia Cup quarter-finals after 3 wins and one draw in their first 4 matches in the group stage with 2 matches more left before the end. He left the club after his contract was not extended for 2017.

Zahasmi Ismail (2017)
On 30 November 2016, Kelantan Football Association has announced that former Kelantan player and interim head coach, Zahasmi Ismail will return to "The Red Warriors" as their new head coach for M-League 2017. Kelantan has been without a head coach after Velizar Popov decided not to renew his contract with Kelantan due to the financial restrictions that Kelantan FA is currently having. The interim president of Kelantan FA, Afandi Hamzah stated that Zahasmi's appointment was made after several discussion were held between the two parties.

Season by season records

P = Played
W = Games won
D = Games drawn
L = Games lost
F = Goals for
A = Goals against
Pts = Points
Pos = Final position
N/A = No answer

LS = Liga Super
LP = Liga Premier
LP1 = Liga Perdana 1
LP2 = Liga Perdana 2  

R1 = Round 1
R2 = Round 2
R3 = Round 3

R4 = Round 4
R5 = Round 5
R6 = Round 6
R16 = Round of 16
GR = Group Stage
QF = Quarter-finals
SF = Semi-finals
RU = Runners-up
S = Shared
W = Winners

Cups

FA Cup 

In 1993 Kelantan entered the semi-finals of the Malaysia FA Cup, but lost to Kedah. Kedah defeated Kelantan with a narrow 3–2 win to enter the finals. The two goals scored by Kelantan came from Hashim Mustapha and Tuan Kamree Tuan Yahya. While in reciprocal action in Kota Bharu, Kelantan lost 0–1. The referee during that game Mohd Jamil Zakaria from Perak was attacked by Kelantan supporters who not satisfied with his decision. M. Karathu first eleven was Kamaruzaman Wan Mohamad, Zahasmi Ismail, Mustapha Aziz, S. Silvarajoo, Zami Mohd Nor, Mohd Zaidi, Tuan Kamree Tuan Yahya, Hashim Mustapha and assisted by 3 import players Dimitri Kalkalnov, Michael Anthony and Kraljevic Marco.

Kelantan won their first FA Cup title during 2012 Malaysia FA Cup campaign. They beat Premier League side Sime Darby with a 1–0 victory. Lebanese striker Mohammed Ghaddar scored the only goal of the match off a penalty kick, which was awarded rather controversially by referee Suhaiza Shukri in the 58th minute. It was a historic day for Kelantan football as the east coast side finally completed a collection of titles in the Malaysia League at the National Stadium, Bukit Jalil.

Kelantan retains the FA Cup during 2013 FA Cup final after defeating Johor Darul Takzim 1–0 in the final at the National Stadium, Bukit Jalil. Kelantan scored the goal in the 14th minute through midfielder Nor Farhan Muhammad through a pass from team captain, Badhri Radzi.

Malaysia Cup

Kelantan much awaited 89-year drought of Malaysia Cup ended in 2010 at National Stadium, Bukit Jalil on 30 October. They came from behind to clinch a 2–1 win over Negeri Sembilan. Badhri Radzi was the hero for the east coast side when he struck the winner in the 65th minute. Kelantan's victorious coach B. Sathianathan refused to commit his future to the newly crowned Malaysia Cup champions as he awaits the result of an appeal against a six-month ban. In 2012, the club again lifted Malaysia Cup trophy after defeating newly promoted side, ATM FA 3–2 in the final and 2012 is the year that will always be remembered by "The Red Warriors" fans after they became the treble winner.

Sponsorship

For season running from 1984 to 2003, Dunhill was club's first shirt sponsor. However, it ended after tobacco sponsorship was banned in Malaysian football. Malaysia's telco, TM is the new shirt sponsors from season 2004 to 2010. In 2010 season, the main sponsors are Al-Hamra Group, Yusmira Trading, Sinar Harian, Air Asia and TM.The sponsor logo will be labeled on the club jersey. The club official sponsor since 2009 are shown below:

2009: Air Asia, Al-Hamra Group
2010: Air Asia, Al-Hamra Group, Yusmira Trading, Sinar Harian
2011: Happy Prepaid, Al-Hamra Group, TRW Station, Yusmira Trading, Sinar Harian, Al-Jabbar Group
2012: Happy Prepaid, Al-Hamra Group, Yusmira Trading, Sinar Harian, Masterskill, Snickers, RW Energy Isotonic, Mamee, Wana Group, Al-Jabbar Group
2013: Hotlink, Adabi, AzizanOsman.com, Sinar Harian, Syarikat Muda Osman, Mamee, Desa Murni Batik, Keropok Sira Cap Menara, Trésenergy.com, Pure're Spritz, Redbull, Wan Huzairil, Secretleaf, Yusri Maju Sdn. Bhd.
2014: Hotlink, UniKL, Adabi, Sinar Harian, Syarikat Muda Osman, Tresenergy, Konsortium Mutiara, Andida, Bayam Hospitality, Secretleaf, Yusry Maju, Hj Ali Home
2015: ChengalJati, Adabi, Sinar Harian, Puspamara, UniKL, redONE, Syarikat Muda Osman (SMO), A.Z.E & Groups Sdn Bhd, Airish Fashion Cosmetic, Mutiara Ekspress, Rennoil
2016: ChengalJati, Sinar Harian, Puspamara, UniKL, redONE, Azham Zamiri & Co.,Puspamara, Mutiara Ekspress, HORC, Delima Perdana, PMB Investment Berhad, Beauty
2017: redONE, Al Hamra Group, Glow Glowing, Chengal Jati, Yakult, Moccis Furniture, Puspamara, Ekspres Mutiara, Sinar Harian

Kit manufacturer
The club's kit manufacturer in 2008 was Nike which lasted for a year. In 2009, Sportzone a local manufacturer took charge. Ever since 2010, Umbro has been the manufacturer for this club.

In 2012, the club's kit manufacturer is Umbro and Warriors. Warriors has been the club only manufacturer since 2010 after Umbro has ended their sponsorship in 2012. The club partnership with Warriors ended in 2016 after 5 years becoming the club main kit manufacturer. The club's current kit manufacturer is PUC Sport (before known as HORC )

1995–2001: Adidas
2002–2008: Nike
2009: Sportzone
2010–2012: Umbro, Warriors
2013–2015: Warriors
2016: Nike, DSV
2017: HORC

Stadium

Kelantan FA are currently based at Sultan Muhammad IV Stadium in Kota Bharu, Kelantan. The capacity of the stadium is 22,000. This has been Kelantan FA's ground since 1946. The Stadium was built in 1967 and aims to provide a venue for sports activities from Kelantan, especially as a soccer field. It was built on the site of a football field of Kelantan Football Association.

See also

 :Category:Kelantan FA
 :Category:Kelantan FA players

References

External links

History at theredwarriorsfc.com

Kelantan F.C.
History of Kelantan FA
History of football in Malaysia
History of association football by club